Rotiboy Bakeshoppe Sdn Bhd (doing business as Rotiboy) is a Malaysian bakery chain based in Kuala Lumpur owned by Rotiboy Bakeshoppe Sdn Bhd. The company has more than 100 outlets in Malaysia, Indonesia, Thailand, South Korea, Saudi Arabia and the United Arab Emirates, as well planning to enter China market.

History 
The company was founded in April 1998 in Bukit Mertajam, Penang, with the name was generated by accident when the founder's brother calling his nephew, "naughty-boy" which sounds like "Rotiboy". In 2002, the company migrated to Wisma Central, Jalan Ampang, Kuala Lumpur. Rotiboy successfully expanded in Klang Valley, and in 2022, Rotiboy opened up its first franchise in East Malaysia in Kuching, Sarawak, followed by other cities in the region such as Sibu, Bintulu and Miri.

International expansion 
In May 2004, Rotiboy International Pte Ltd was established in Singapore. Between 2004 and 2007, Rotiboy has expanded its operations to Singapore, Indonesia, Thailand and South Korea. In 2012, Rotiboy opens its stores in United Arab Emirates and Saudi Arabia.

See also 

 List of bakeries
 List of bakery cafés

References

External links 
 

Bakeries of Malaysia
Privately held companies of Malaysia
Malaysian brands
Food and drink companies of Malaysia
Food and drink companies established in 1998
Retail companies established in 1998
1998 establishments in Malaysia